is a railway station in the city of Kōriyama, Fukushima Prefecture, Japan, operated by the East Japan Railway Company (JR East), with a freight terminal operated by the Japan Freight Railway Company.

Lines
It is also a terminus for the Suigun Line and the Banetsu West Line.

Station layout

Kōriyama Station has two island platforms and one bay platform serving trains on the conventional (narrow gauge) lines, and one island platform and one side platform for shinkansen traffic. The station has a Midori no Madoguchi staffed ticket office.

Platforms

 
 

The song "Tobira" (扉, Tobira) is used as a departure melody on all conventional platforms and the song "Kiseki" (キセキ, Kiseki) is used as a departure melody on all Shinkansen platforms in 2015. Both songs are by Greeeen, a hip hop group originating in Kōriyama.

History
Komiyama Station opened on July 16, 1887, with service on the Nippon Railway between Kōriyama and Kuroiso. Services on the Ganetsu Line began from July 26, 1898. The station building was rebuilt in 1900. In 1906, the Nippon Railway became the Japanese Government Railway and the station was rebuilt in 1913. On October 10, 1917, the name of Ganetsu Line was changed to Banetsu Line. The station was rebuilt in 1951 and once again in 1980. From June 23, 1982, services on the Tohoku Shinkansen began.

Passenger statistics
In fiscal 2016, the station was used by an average of 18,110 passengers daily (boarding passengers only). Data for previous years as follows:

Surrounding area
Kōriyama Station is located in the centre of the city of Kōriyama.

See also
 List of railway stations in Japan

References

External links

 

Stations of East Japan Railway Company
Tōhoku Shinkansen
Railway stations in Fukushima Prefecture
Tōhoku Main Line
Ban'etsu West Line
Ban'etsu East Line
Suigun Line
Railway stations in Japan opened in 1887
Kōriyama
Stations of Japan Freight Railway Company